Crop acreage base is a crop-specific measure equal to the average number of acres planted (or considered planted) to a particular program crop for a specified number of years. The crop-specific nature of this measurement was important prior to the 1996 farm bill (P.L. 104-127), which adopted an inclusive measure of base acreage and allowed planting flexibility among the program crops.  The sum of the crop acreage bases for all program crops on a farm could not exceed the farm acreage.  The acreage base was used in determining the number of acres a farmer, under an acreage reduction program, had to remove from normal crop production and devote to conserving uses in order to be eligible for USDA price and income supports.

See also
Base acreage
Farm acreage base

References 

Federal Agriculture Improvement and Reform Act of 1996
United States Department of Agriculture